Thomas Wainfleet (by 1463 – 1515), of Canterbury, Kent, was an English politician.

Family
Wainfleet was the son of Thomas Wainfleet of Canterbury. He was unmarried, but had an illegitimate son.

Career
Active in local politics, he was a common councilman for Canterbury by 1500, an alderman by 1504 and mayor for 1514–15. In 1512, he was elected a Member of Parliament for Canterbury.

References

Year of birth missing
15th-century births
1515 deaths
People from Canterbury
Mayors of Canterbury
English MPs 1512–1514